The Integrated Developmental School (commonly referred to as IDS) is the high school department of MSU-Iligan Institute of Technology (MSU-IIT) in Iligan City, Philippines. It was established in 1946 as the Iligan High School (IHS) to respond to the need of the Iligan constituents to have their own high school. Later, it was named Lanao Technical School (LTS) from 1956 to 1967 created under R.A. 1562, a high school specializing vocational and technical courses. Although it never was implemented in 1965, Lanao Technical School became Northern Mindanao Institute of Technology through RA 4626. On July 12, 1968 under R.A. 5363, Lanao Technical School was annexed to Mindanao State University, it was renamed Developmental High School (DHS). At present, under BOR Resolution No. 147 s. 1992, it is known as Integrated Developmental School (IDS), a laboratory school of the College of Education.

References

Official website

Schools in Iligan
High schools in the Philippines